New Mexico United is an American professional soccer team based in Albuquerque, New Mexico. Founded in 2018, the team currently plays in the USL Championship, the second division of American soccer.

History

Former teams

The state of New Mexico gained its first professional soccer team in the 1990s, the New Mexico Chiles of the American Professional Soccer League and later the USISL. The team was runner-up for the league title in 1995 and attracted an average home attendance of 3,854, but was folded by its owners in 1996. The Chiles was replaced the following season by the Albuquerque Geckos, who entered USISL's Division 3 with new owners and played at a new soccer stadium shared with the collegiate New Mexico Lobos. The Geckos won the Division 3 championship and were promoted to the second division A-League in 1998, but struggled to win matches and were unable to pay players and creditors. The team had an average attendance of 1,200 and announced their move to Sacramento, California in October 1998.

A semi-professional team, the Albuquerque Sol, was established in 2014 to capitalize on the area's interest in soccer. The team's owners stated that their goal was to earn a USL expansion team within a few years and eventually move to Major League Soccer (MLS). The Sol commissioned a study in 2016 to analyze a potential downtown soccer-specific stadium with 10,000 seats to support a USL expansion in 2018 and a MLS expansion by 2024. The stadium study identified three potential locations in downtown Albuquerque for a stadium, which would cost $24–45 million.

USL launch and inaugural season

On June 6, 2018, the USL announced an expansion club from Albuquerque that would begin play in March 2019. The club announced its name, New Mexico United, and colors on October 9, 2018, following fan suggestions that generated 226 total names.

The team played its opening match on March 9, 2019, with 12,896 fans in attendance at Isotopes Park. Devon Sandoval scored the team's first-ever goal in a 1–1 draw against Fresno FC. New Mexico United enjoyed popular success in its inaugural season, leading the USL Championship in average attendance and selling out Isotopes Park with 15,023 spectators on May 5, 2019. In the 2019 U.S. Open Cup, the team defeated two MLS clubs (the Colorado Rapids and FC Dallas) before losing in the quarterfinals to Minnesota United FC; for the match in Minnesota, the club organized a charter flight from Albuquerque that carried 180 away fans.

2020 season
In March 2020, the USL Championship postponed the 2020 season with the onset of the COVID-19 pandemic, after New Mexico United had played one game. The season restarted in July 2020 with a modified format, placing teams into eight smaller regional groups. The club was placed in Group C with Four Corners opponents Colorado Springs Switchbacks FC and Real Monarchs, and nearby El Paso Locomotive FC. Due to statewide health orders and quarantine requirements, New Mexico United played all 15 of their regular season matches and both of their playoff matches away from home, earning the local nickname the "Road Warriors." The team ended the regular season with a record of 8 wins, 3 draws, and 4 losses; a sixteenth planned match against Rio Grande Valley FC Toros was postponed, and eventually cancelled, due to cases of COVID-19 in the Rio Grande Valley organization.<ref>{{Cite news |last=Sickenger |first=Ken |date=September 21, 2020 |title=New Mexico United, RGVFC postpone match because of RGVFCs positive COVID-19 test results |url=https://www.abqjournal.com/1498578/new-mexico-united-rgvfc-postpone-match-because-of-rgvfcs-positive-covid-19-test-results.html|access-date=February 25, 2021 |website=Albuquerque Journal}}</ref>

The club qualified for the USL Championship Playoffs by coming second in their group. In the Western Conference Quarterfinals, they defeated San Antonio FC in extra time, with Chris Wehan scoring the winning goal in the 101st minute. In the Conference Semifinal, the club lost to El Paso Locomotive 3-5 on penalties, after drawing 1-1 at the end of extra time.

In March 2020, the club launched the Somos Unidos Foundation, a charitable nonprofit arm of the New Mexico United organization.

 2021 season 
In May 2021, New Mexico United began its competitive season with a 1-0 loss away to Rio Grande Valley FC Toros. On August 21, then 17-year-old Cristian Nava became the first New Mexico United Academy player to sign a professional contract with the club.

Club crest and colors

The New Mexico United crest is a simple yellow shield with four black lines that represent the Zia symbol, found on the state flag and used with permission from the Zia people. The crest also has a black diamond with the number "18", representing the year the club was founded. The yellow-and-black color scheme was colored to reference the state flag while differentiating itself from other local clubs.

Sponsorship

Stadium

The club plays at Rio Grande Credit Union Field at Isotopes Park, known as only Isotopes Park in 2019 and nicknamed The Lab, a baseball stadium that is primarily home to the Albuquerque Isotopes of the Pacific Coast League. New Mexico United will play at the facility until a soccer-specific stadium is built. The Isotopes will remain the primary tenant and the USL team will schedule its home games during away games for the Isotopes. The stadium seats 13,500 spectators for baseball games.

In February 2020, New Mexico United announced that it would develop a home stadium and community culture center after being awarded $4.1 million in capital outlay funds by the state legislature. A public poll of Albuquerque residents conducted in January 2021 found strong support for the construction of the stadium and culture center complex.

On July 25, 2021, Albuquerque Mayor Tim Keller announced a stadium financing plan that would involve selling $50 million in public bonds to fund part of the $65–75 million construction cost. The team agreed to commit $10 million in upfront costs, and another $22 million in rent over the next 25 years. The plan was forwarded to the City Council, which agreed to put it to a public vote on November 2. The ballot measure was rejected by a 2–1 margin.

 Rivalries 
New Mexico United has rivalries with El Paso Locomotive FC, with whom they contest the Derby Del Camino Real, and Phoenix Rising FC. 

Players and staff

Current roster

Note: Flags indicate national team as defined under FIFA eligibility rules. Players may hold more than one non-FIFA nationality.

Technical staff
{| class="wikitable sortable"
|-
! style="background:#000; color:#fcf000; border:2px solid #fcf000;" scope="col"|Title
! style="background:#000; color:#fcf000; border:2px solid #fcf000;" scope="col"|Name
|-

Front office
{| class="wikitable sortable"
|-
! style="background:#000; color:#fcf000; border:2px solid #fcf000;" scope="col"|Title
! style="background:#000; color:#fcf000; border:2px solid #fcf000;" scope="col"|Name
|-

Ownership
The club's majority owner and team president is New Mexico resident, Peter Trevisani. The club's other owners have ties to New Mexico and include investor Ian McKinnon, TEAM8, Ed Garcia, Ben Spencer, and Jason Harrington.

Team records

 Year-by-year total 

1. Top Scorer includes all competitive matches.

2. Points assigns the same point values to knockout matches as the same result would receive in the league.

3. All-time results includes all competitive matches.

 USL Championship 

1. Top Scorer includes statistics from regular season league matches only.

 USL Cup Playoffs 

1. Following statistical convention, wins in extra time are recorded as wins. Wins in penalty shootouts are recorded as draws, and shootout goals are not counted as goals for or against.

 U.S. Open Cup 

1. Following statistical convention, wins in extra time are recorded as wins. Wins in penalty shootouts are recorded as draws, and shootout goals are not counted as goals for or against.

2. The 2020 U.S. Open Cup was suspended on March 13, 2020, due to the COVID-19 pandemic. On August 14, the 2020 edition was cancelled.

3. The USSF confirmed on March 29, 2021, that the previous season's Conference finalists would participate. As Western Conference losing semifinalists, New Mexico United did not qualify. On July 20, 2021, the USSF cancelled the 2021 edition of the tournament.

Head coaches
 Includes USL Regular Season, USL Playoffs, U.S. Open Cup. Excludes friendlies.

Average attendance

Player records
Most goals
 Players in bold are still active with New Mexico United; includes goals in all competitive matches
Includes regular season, playoffs, and domestic cup
 As of July 23, 2022.

 Most appearances 

 Players in bold are still active with New Mexico United; includes all competitive appearances, including substitute appearances
Includes regular season, playoffs, and domestic cupAs of April 23, 2022''

New Mexico United U23 

On January 23, 2020, New Mexico United announced that it will field a U23 team in the USL League Two for the 2020 season, intending for the U23 team to bridge the gap between the High Performance Youth Program and the first team. The club was scheduled to compete in the Mountain Division. However, on April 30, 2020, the United Soccer League announced the cancellation of the 2020 League Two season due to the COVID-19 pandemic in the United States. The U23 team did not participate in the 2021 USL League Two season.

References

External links

 

 
USL Championship teams
2018 establishments in New Mexico
Sports in Albuquerque, New Mexico
Association football clubs established in 2018
Soccer clubs in New Mexico